Samuel Ford may refer to:

Samuel Howard Ford (1819–1905), English-born Kentucky Confederate politician
Samuel Clarence Ford (1882–1961), American politician, Governor of Montana

See also
Samuel Forde, Irish artist